Jalen Curtis Tolbert (born February 27, 1999) is an American football wide receiver for the Dallas Cowboys of the National Football League (NFL). He played college football at South Alabama and was named the Sun Belt Conference Offensive Player of the Year as a senior in 2021.

Early life and high school
Tolbert was born on February 27, 1999, in Mobile, Alabama, and attended McGill–Toolen Catholic High School, where he played baseball, basketball, and football. He did not become a starter until his senior year and finished the season with 37 receptions for 696 yards and nine touchdowns. Tolbert was rated a two-star recruit and initially committed to play college football at Jacksonville State before choosing to attend the University of South Alabama.

College career
Tolbert redshirted his true freshman season at South Alabama after suffering a knee injury in preseason training camp. He entered the starting lineup as a redshirt sophomore and finished the season with 27 receptions for 521 yards and six touchdowns. Tolbert was named first-team All-Sun Belt Conference as a redshirt junior after catching 64 passes for 1,085 yards, both school records, and eight touchdowns, which tied the school record. Against Arkansas State, he set a school record with 252 receiving yards on ten receptions with three touchdowns. He was again named first-team All-Sun Belt and the conference's Offensive Player of the Year in 2021 after resetting his own school records with 82 receptions for 1,474 receiving yards and eight touchdowns.

College statistics

Professional career

Tolbert was drafted by the Dallas Cowboys in the third round (88th overall) of the 2022 NFL Draft.

References

External links
 Dallas Cowboys bio
South Alabama Jaguars bio

1999 births
American football wide receivers
South Alabama Jaguars football players
Players of American football from Alabama
Living people
Sportspeople from Mobile, Alabama
Dallas Cowboys players